Toxoproctis cosmia is a moth of the family Erebidae. It is found in Sundaland.

External links
The Moths of Borneo

Lymantriinae
Moths described in 1932